The 2017 Scarborough SC season was the third season in the club's participation in the Canadian Soccer League. They began the season on May 27, 2017 at home against York Region Shooters. The season concluded with Scarborough securing a postseason berth by finishing fourth in the standings. In the preliminary rounds of the playoffs they secured the necessary wins in order to make their first CSL Championship appearance. In the finals they were defeated by the York Region Shooters in a penalty shootout.

Summary 
In preparation for the 2017 season general manager Kiril Dimitrov acquired the services of Krum Bibishkov as a Player-coach. Scarborough continued its policy of recruiting overseas talent in order to bring more depth to the roster. Throughout the majority of the season the team battled for the fourth position standing, until achieving a five game undefeated streak at the end of the season in order to clinch that berth. Their overall success saw the club finish in the top four in best offensive and defensive records with Aleksandar Stojiljković winning the CSL Golden Boot. In the first round of the postseason they faced Brantford Galaxy, and advanced to the next round after a 6-2 victory. Scarborough made club history by defeating FC Vorkuta by a score of 1-0 to make their first CSL Championship final appearance. Their opponents in the finals were York Region Shooters, where Scarborough was denied the title after a 5-4 defeat in a penalty shootout.

Transfers

In

Out

Competitions

Canadian Soccer League

League table

First Division

Results summary

Results by round

Matches

Statistics

Goals 
Correct as of November 10, 2017

References   

Scarborough SC
Scarborough SC